Stockton is a former settlement in the northwestern South Island of New Zealand in the West Coast region. It is located in the Papahaua Ranges about 30 kilometres linear distance north east from Westport.

Stockton is best known for the Stockton Mine operated by Solid Energy. This mine had the first electric railway in New Zealand, from 1908 to 1953, when it was replaced by an aerial cableway.

References

External links
Solid Energy - Stockton mine page

Buller District
Mining communities in New Zealand
Ghost towns in the West Coast, New Zealand